Alex Benno (2 November 1873 – 2 April 1952) was a Dutch film actor, screenwriter and director of the silent era. He appeared in 15 films between 1913 and 1920.

Filmography
 John Heriot's Wife (1920)
 Schakels (1920)
 Brotherhood of Steel (1918)
 Madame Pinkette & Co (1917)
 Majoor Frans (1916)
 Vogelvrij (1916)
 Het geheim van den vuurtoren (1916)
 Koningin Elisabeth's dochter (1915)
 Ontmaskerd (1915)
 Toffe jongens onder de mobilisatie (1914)
 Luchtkastelen (1914)
 Weergevonden (1914)
 Heilig recht (1914)
 Liefde waakt (1914)
 Krates (1913)
 De levende ladder (1913)

External links

 eyefilm.nl Film Museum

1873 births
1952 deaths
Dutch male film actors
Dutch male silent film actors
Dutch film directors
Dutch screenwriters
Dutch male screenwriters
People from Oberhausen
20th-century Dutch male actors
Silent film screenwriters
20th-century screenwriters